Preservation Iowa, formerly called the Iowa Historic Preservation Alliance (IHPA), was founded in 1989 by members of the public concerned about the destruction of significant historic sites and buildings in the state of Iowa. 

Preservation Iowa sponsors two programs, Iowa's Most Endangered Properties and Preservation at its Best Awards. Currently, it is undertaking initiatives to document barns, country schools, and small-town movie theaters. Preservation Iowa and the National Trust for Historic Preservation are combining efforts to document and mitigate the effects of the 2008 Iowa floods on historic structures.

Preservation Iowa publishes the Iowa Preservationist quarterly.

The 2008 Preservation Iowa "Iowa's Most Endangered Properties" include:
 Gruwell and Crew General Store, West Branch (on the NRHP)
 Len Jus Building (Mason City, Iowa), Mason City
 Masonic Building (Burrows Block--Bank Block), Osceola
 Union Block, Mount Pleasant (on the NRHP)
 Fort Madison Archaeological Site, Fort Madison (on the NRHP)
 Faeth Farmstead and Orchard District, Fort Madison (on the NRHP)
 Grant Wood Home, 318 14th Street NE, Cedar Rapids
 Bethel African Methodist Church, Cedar Rapids
 Flooded Historic Neighborhoods, Cedar Rapids

Endangered historic Iowa gallery

References

External links
Preservation Iowa site

State history organizations of the United States
Non-profit organizations based in Iowa
Historic preservation organizations in the United States
Organizations established in 1989
1989 establishments in Iowa